Taiwanese singer Jolin Tsai has released 40 singles and 8 promotional singles. In 1999, she released her debut studio album 1019 and the singles "Living with the World", "The Rose", and "I Know You're Feeling Blue", and "I Know You're Feeling Blue" reached number 30 on the Hit FM Top 100 Singles of the Year chart, the Taiwan's equivalent to the Billboard Year-End Hot 100. In 2000, she released her second studio album Don't Stop and the single under the same title, and the single reached number 17 on the Hit FM Top 100. In 2000, she released her third studio album Show Your Love and the single under the same title. In 2001, she released her fourth studio album Lucky Number and the single "Where the Dream Takes You". In 2003, she released her fifth studio album Magic and the single "Magic", and the single reached number 24 on the Hit FM Top 100. In 2005, she released her seventh studio album J-Game and the single under the same title, and the single reached number 26 on the Hit FM Top 100.

In 2006, she released her eighth studio album Dancing Diva and the single "Dancing Diva", and the single reached number 33 on the Hit FM Top 100. In 2007, she released her ninth studio album Agent J and the single under the same title, and the single reached number 14 on the Hit FM Top 100. In 2009, she released her tenth studio album Butterfly and the single "Real Man", and the single reached number 25 on the Hit FM Top 100. In 2010, she released her eleventh studio album Myself and the single "Honey Trap", and the single reached number one on the Hit FM Top 100. In 2012, she released her twelfth studio album Muse and the single "The Great Artist", and the single reached number two on the Hit FM Top 100. In 2014, she released her thirteenth studio album Play and the singles "Play" and "The Third Person and I", and "Play" and "The Third Person and I" reached number one and number eight on the Hit FM Top 100, respectively. In 2018, she released her fourteenth studio album Ugly Beauty and the single under the same title, and the single reached number one on the Hit FM Top 100.

Singles

Promotional singles

References

External links 
 
 

Discographies of Taiwanese artists
Discography
Pop music discographies